Art of the Acoustic Steel String Guitar 6 & 12 is the eleventh studio album by composer and guitarist Robbie Basho, released in 1979 by Windham Hill Records. It was restored and remastered from the original master tapes by Joe Churchich and Kyle Fosburgh and re-issued by Grass-Tops Recording and Gnome Life Records on October 21, 2014.

Track listing

Personnel
Adapted from the Art of the Acoustic Steel String Guitar 6 & 12 liner notes.
 Robbie Basho – acoustic guitar, vocals
 William Ackerman – production
 Ron Cook – executive producer
 Ron May – cover art
 Dennis Reed – recording, mixing

Release history

References

External links 
 

1979 albums
Robbie Basho albums
Windham Hill Records albums
Albums produced by William Ackerman